Px38-805, named Leon, is a preserved Polish  narrow gauge steam locomotive built by Fablok in Chrzanów, Poland.  It was the only locomotive of PKP class Px38, and one of three built locomotives of Fablok W5A type.

History 
In 1929 the First Locomotive Factory in Poland (Fablok) designed a W5A type locomotive, basing upon its earlier W2A type (PKP Tx26-427), and manufactured two units (later designated PKP class Px27). In 1938 another one slightly differing locomotive was ordered by Września County Railway (Wrzesińska Kolej Powiatowa), later to become Px38 class. It was a D locomotive with a two-axle tender. It was powered by a simple twin engine, working on a saturated steam, developing 110 hp power output. 

The locomotive, factory no. 727, was given a stock number 5 (W.K.P. N°5). It survived World War II, working on its railway. After the war, all county railways were taken over by the Polish State Railways (PKP) and in 1947 the locomotive was included into a collective PKP Px4 class and given a designation Px4-805. According to new regulations, in 1961 the locomotive was renumbered to Px38-805, being the only machine of Px38 class (P - locomotive with a tender, x - D axle arrangement, 38 – Polish origin locomotive built in 1938).

In following years the locomotive was used on most of PKP 600 mm railways. From 1958 it stationed for a longer term in Myszyniec, and from 1973 in Białośliwie. From 1983 it has been stationed in Żnin, currently on a museum railway of Narrow Gauge Railway Museum in Wenecja. From 2002 the locomotive has a name Leon, in a memory of a Narrow Gauge Railway Museum guide Leon Lichociński.

It has been active, as of 2015. In 2015 it left Poland for the first time, taking part in narrow gauge railway meetings in Germany and Pithiviers in France.

References

.

See also
Narrow gauge railways in Poland

External links 
 Px38-805 - Wciąż pod parą Additional photographs and information (Polish)

Narrow gauge steam locomotives of Poland
Preserved steam locomotives of Poland
Polish State Railways steam locomotives
600 mm gauge railway locomotives
0-8-0 locomotives